Hacıbayram can refer to:

 Hacıbayram, Bayat
 Hacıbayram, Karayazı
 Hacıbayram, Tercan